The 1971 Central Michigan Chippewas football team represented Central Michigan University as an independent during the 1971 NCAA College Division football season. In their fifth season under head coach Roy Kramer, the Chippewas compiled a 5–5 record and outscored their opponents, 183 to 181. The team's statistical leaders included quarterback Mick Brzezinski with 426 passing yards, tailback Jesse Lakes with 1,143 rushing yards, and Ron Goodin with 186 receiving yards. Lakes received the team's most valuable player award for the second consecutive year.

Schedule

References

Central Michigan
Central Michigan Chippewas football seasons
Central Michigan Chippewas football